Downtown Boys are an American punk rock band formed in 2011 in Providence, Rhode Island, United States.  They have received press coverage in Rolling Stone, The New Yorker and Spin.

History
Downtown Boys formed after What Cheer? Brigade tubaist Joey La Neve DeFrancesco met vocalist Victoria Ruiz while working at the Renaissance Hotel in Providence, Rhode Island. DeFrancesco famously quit the hotel by handing in his letter of resignation accompanied by his What Cheer? bandmates. The footage of the resignation went viral.

In 2014, the band released a 7" single on Washington D.C.-based Sister Polygon Records to wide acclaim. Downtown Boys released second LP, Full Communism, on Don Giovanni Records on May 5, 2015. The album's lead single, "Monstro", drew critical attention from Pitchfork, Stereogum, and the broader music press. Rachel Brodsky of Spin wrote of the single: "Bravely combating, as their press release reads, 'the prison-industrial complex, racism, queerphobia, capitalism, fascism, boredom, and all things people use to try to close our minds, eyes and hearts,' Downtown Boys do what their finest punk-rock forefathers did before them: challenge long-held ideas."

The group performed on news show Democracy Now! and was interviewed by host Amy Goodman.

Rolling Stone featured the group and dubbed them "America's Most Exciting Punk Band".

The New Yorker described the group's live performances, noting that "[t]he tracks speed by with hardcore kineticism, but Ruiz's lyrics squeeze your hand through the pit: she's lucid and blunt, celebrating cops, traders, and any other impediment to justice that she can spot. There's something distinctly post-punk about the Boys, ... [i]t could be the saxophone, but it's probably the spirit."

In 2015, Ruiz and DeFrancesco launched the online magazine Spark Mag in collaboration with grassroots advocacy group Demand Progress. The site aims to feature underground and radical artists and connect fans to organizing work.

In 2017, the band played the Coachella Music and Arts festival. They later released an open letter denouncing the festival's business practices and claimed that they would donate "a portion of the money" paid to them by Coachella to unspecified LGBTQ organizations. The amount donated and the recipients have not been made public. Later that year, the band released their third LP Cost of Living on Sub Pop Records.

The band composed the original music for the biographical film Miss Marx (2020) by Italian director Susanna Nicchiarelli. Their soundtrack won the David di Donatello award for Best Music, and the Venice Film Festival Soundtrack Stars Award.

Discography
Downtown Boys (cass/cd/dl), 2012
Downtown Boys EP (ltd 7"/dl) Sister Polygon Records, 2014
Full Communism (cd/lp/dl) Don Giovanni Records, 2015
Cost of Living Sub Pop Records, 2017

References

External links
Don Giovanni Records official website
Sister Polygon Records official website
Downtown Boys bandcamp
Downtown Boys on Sub Pop

American punk rock groups
Musical groups from Providence, Rhode Island
Musical groups established in 2011
Don Giovanni Records artists
2011 establishments in Rhode Island